"Openhearted" is a 1983 song by Australian band Real Life. The song was released in August 1983 as the second single from the band's debut studio album Heartland. The song peaked at number 72 on the Australian Kent Music Report.

Reception
In an album review, Tomas Mureika from AllMusic said "Openhearted" was "built on solid [a] pop hook."
}}

Track listing
7" single (WRS 003)
 "Openhearted" – 3:52
 "Pick Me Up" – 3:18

Charts

References

1983 songs
1983 singles
Real Life (band) songs
Curb Records singles